The 1965 Illinois Fighting Illini football team represented the University of Illinois in the 1965 Big Ten Conference football season. In their sixth season under head coach Pete Elliott, the Illini compiled a 6–4 (4–3 against Big Ten Conference opponents), outscored opponents 235 to 118, and finished fifth in the Big Ten. Fullback Jim Grabowski was selected as the team's most valuable player, received the team's most valuable player award, and was a consensus pick for the 1965 College Football All-America Team.

Schedule

Awards and honors
 Jim Grabowski (fullback)
 Chicago Tribune Silver Football
 Consensus All-American

Team players in the NFL

 Jim Grabowski was also the first pick overall in the 1966 American Football League Draft. He was the first ever draft pick of the Miami Dolphins.

References

Illinois
Illinois Fighting Illini football seasons
Illinois Fighting Illini football